Koen Kostons (born 18 September 1999) is a Dutch professional footballer who plays as a striker for Eerste Divisie club MVV.

Career

MVV
Kostons progressed through MVV's youth academy, joining their setup as a thirteen-year-old from boyhood club Lanaken VV. In the 2016–17 Eerste Divisie season, he was included in the matchday squad of the first team on several occasions, but did not yet make his debut. He made his debut on 19 September 2017 in a 3–2 loss to AZ in the KNVB Cup, replacing Christophe Janssens in the 90th minute. Kostons made his league debut on 6 October 2017 in a 3–2 loss against Almere City, coming off the bench in the 88th minute for Shermaine Martina. On 24 November 2017, he scored his first professional goal in a 3–1 victory against Helmond Sport.

Dalkurd
On 27 July 2021, Kostons joined Swedish third-tier Ettan club Dalkurd. He made his debut for Dalkurd on 15 August 2021, also scoring his first goal for the club, in a 1–1 draw against Umeå FC.

He was part of Dalkurd's promotion to the second highest level in Sweden, Superettan, scoring 11 goals in 16 appearances.

Return to MVV
On 4 July 2022, Kostons returned to his former club MVV on a two-year contract. He made his return debut for MVV on the first matchday of the 2022–23 season, starting at forward alongside Orhan Džepar in a 3–1 loss to Jong AZ. The following week he scored his first goal for the club upon returning, opening the score in a 3–1 home win over NAC Breda.

Career statistics

References

External links
 Koen Kostons profile at MVV.nl
 

1999 births
Sportspeople from Genk
Footballers from Limburg (Belgium)
Living people
Dutch footballers
Association football forwards
MVV Maastricht players
Dalkurd FF players
Eerste Divisie players
Ettan Fotboll players
Superettan players
Dutch expatriate footballers
Dutch expatriate sportspeople in Sweden
Expatriate footballers in Sweden